Edmunds is a Latvian masculine given name; a Latvian variant of the given name Edmund. People bearing the name Edmunds include:

Edmunds Augstkalns (born 1994), ice hockey player
Edmunds Elksnis (born 1990), basketball player 
Edmunds Pīlāgs (1927–1995), sprinter
Edmunds Sprūdžs (born 1980), politician and businessman
Edmunds Vasiļjevs (born 1954), ice hockey player

References

Latvian masculine given names
Masculine given names